Gilboa Fossil Forest, New York, United States, is a petrified forest and one of the oldest known forests. Located near the Gilboa Dam in Schoharie County, New York, the region is home to tree trunks from the Devonian period. The fossils, some of the only survivors of their type in the world, are believed to have been from one of the first forests on Earth, and was part of the Earth's afforestation. Paleobotanists have been interested in the site since the 1920s when construction work for a water supply project found several large, vertical fossilized stumps. Some of these remain on display at the Gilboa Dam site and the New York Power Authority Blenheim-Gilboa Visitor's Center in Schoharie County and at the New York State Museum.

References

Further reading 
Staff Writers, Binghamton, NY (SPX) Apr 23, 2007, Mystery Of Oldest Trees Unraveled
Geoff Ryan (718/595-6600), September 25, 2000, Rare Fossil Trees To Be Moved To New Site In Gilboa 
Staff Writers, Cardiff. NY (SPX) Apr 20,2007, Mystery of Fossilized Trees Is Solved
Michael Hill, Albany, NY (AP) June 3, 2007, Fossilized tree found in N.Y. 
Rachel Coker, Binghamton Univ., NY April 19, 2007, Volume 28, No.27., Faculty member helps unravel mystery of Earth's oldest forest

External links 

 Gilboa Fossils website
 Gilboa Historical Society

Paleozoic paleontological sites of North America
Geology of New York (state)
Forests of New York (state)
Protected areas of Schoharie County, New York
Petrified forests
Paleontology in New York (state)
Devonian paleontological sites
Fossil parks in the United States